Pikes Creek Reservoir (also known as Pike Creek Reservoir or Ceasetown Reservoir) is a reservoir in Luzerne County, Pennsylvania, in the United States. The lake is situated on Pikes Creek. It has a volume of approximately 3 billion gallons and is used as a water supply reservoir. As of 2013, it is inhabited by fifteen fish species. The reservoir is owned by the Pennsylvania-American Water Company, but shoreline fishing is permitted at designated spots.

Hydrology, geography and geology
The reservoir is situated on Pikes Creek. It is entirely within the United States Geological Survey quadrangle of Harveys Lake.

It has a typical volume of approximately three billion gallons.

Pikes Creek Reservoir is in the vicinity of Pennsylvania Route 29.

A Pennsylvania American Water representative has described Pikes Creek Reservoir as "a very good source, very good quality". Water quality tests are done on the reservoir's water on a daily basis by the company.

History
Pikes Creek Reservoir was entered into the Geographic Names Information System on August 2, 1979. Its identifier in the Geographic Names Information System is 1183732. The reservoir is also known as Pike Creek Reservoir or Ceasetown Reservoir.

Pikes Creek Reservoir existed by the 1930s. In around 1932, 80 percent of the reservoir's water supply became exhausted, causing water restrictions to be put in place in Wilkes-Barre. The reservoir was opened to fishing with some limitations in 1998.

As of 2013, the Pennsylvania-American Water Company owns Pikes Creek Reservoir. In the spring of 2013, Pennsylvania Fish and Boat Commission biologists did a fish survey of the reservoir. The main purpose of the reservoir is as a supply of potable water. The Pennsylvania-American Water Company has a facility on the reservoir capable of processing 16 million gallons of water per day, but it normally processes around 9 million gallons.

As of 2010, Pikes Creek Reservoir serves a total of 70,000 customers in 14 municipalities, from Shickshinny to Wilkes-Barre. The nearby Harveys Creek is used as an emergency backup water source during droughts, although, as of 2010, it has not been needed since around 2000.

Biology
In 2013, a total of fifteen fish species were observed in Pikes Creek Reservoir. In addition to bluegills, the main panfish species in the reservoir were black crappies and yellow perch. Other fish species included white sucker (34 individuals caught), chain pickerel (32 individuals caught), brown bullhead (25 individuals caught), and yellow bullhead (20 individuals caught). Other species were less common in the reservoir, including smallmouth bass (ten individuals caught), channel catfish (three individuals caught), golden shiner (two individuals caught), green sunfish (one individual caught), and bluespotted sunfish (one individual caught).

Recreation
The Pennsylvania-American Water Company permits shoreline fishing on Pikes Creek Reservoir in designated areas. However, ice fishing, boating, wading, and swimming are forbidden in the reservoir.

See also
Harveys Lake (Pennsylvania)
List of lakes in Pennsylvania

References

Lakes of Luzerne County, Pennsylvania
Reservoirs in Pennsylvania